

Current

Play-by-play
Karl Ravech
Mike Monaco

Analysts
Kyle Peterson
Jessica Mendoza
Tim Kurkjian
Xavier Scruggs
Todd Frazier
David Cone
Eduardo Pérez
Mo'ne Davis

Reporters
Julie Foudy
Sebastian Salazar

Former

Play-by-play
Adnan Virk
Jack Edwards
Terry Gannon
Al Michaels
Jim McKay
Jon Sciambi
Sean McDonough
Dave Ryan
Dave Pasch
Brent Musburger
Keith Jackson
Bud Palmer
Curt Gowdy
Al Trautwig
John Saunders
Gary Thorne
Chris McKendry
Jay Crawford
Sebastian Salazar
Dave Flemming
Kevin Connors

Analysts
Harold Reynolds (–2005)
Dusty Baker (2007)
Joe Morgan (2006)
Orestes Destrade
Tony Gwynn
Tom Candiotti
Jim Palmer
Jimmy Key
Bobby Valentine
Terry Francona
Orel Hershiser
Barry Larkin
Chris Burke
Curt Schilling
Nomar Garciaparra
David Belisle
John Kruk
Dallas Braden
Aaron Boone
David Ross

Reporters
Sophie Cortina
Erin Andrews
Jenn Brown
Álvaro Martín
Sam Ryan
Penn Holderness
Grant Paulsen
Stacey Dales
Pedro Gomez
Dave Ryan
Adrianna Monsalve
Kyle Peterson
Mateo Arias
Monica Gonzales
Jaymee Sire
Marysol Castro

See also
Little League World Series on television
List of Little League World Series Championship Game broadcasters

ABC Sports
Little League World Series
Wide World of Sports (American TV series)
Announcers
Little League